The third season of The Wonder Years aired on ABC from October 3, 1989 to May 16, 1990.

Episodes

Fred Savage was present for all episodes.
Olivia d'Abo was absent for 11 episodes.
Danica McKellar was absent for 7 episodes.
Dan Lauria and Alley Mills were both absent for 6 episodes each.
Jason Hervey was absent for 3 episodes.
Josh Saviano was absent for 1 episode.
Daniel Stern was present for all episodes.

References

1989 American television seasons
1990 American television seasons
The Wonder Years seasons